Lior Genish is a former Israeli footballer who played in Maccabi Netanya.

Honours
Israeli Youth Championship:
Winner (1): 1994-95
Youth State Cup:
Winner (1): 1996
Israeli Second Division:
Winner (1): 1998-99

References

1980 births
Living people
Israeli Jews
Israeli footballers
Maccabi Netanya F.C. players
Hapoel Haifa F.C. players
Sektzia Ness Ziona F.C. players
Hapoel Herzliya F.C. players
Footballers from Netanya
Israeli Premier League players
Liga Leumit players
Association football defenders